The Gongzi Liao Fort is a former fort in Xinyi District, Keelung, Taiwan.

History
The fort was built by the Japanese in 1904 after they landed in Keeling following the Treaty of Shimonoseki with Qing Dynasty. After the handover of Taiwan from Japan to the Republic of China in 1945, the fort was still used as a military facility and garrison was placed there.

Architecture
The fort is divided into four areas, which are living area and barracks, warehouse, gun emplacement and observatory. The fort is also equipped with facilities such as lookout posts, barricades, command stations, blockhouses, tunnels, ammunition depots, water reservoir etc.

See also
 List of tourist attractions in Taiwan

References

1904 establishments in Taiwan
Forts in Keelung
Military installations established in 1904
National monuments of Taiwan